Alicia Jo Rabins is a performer, musician, singer, composer, poet, writer, and Jewish scholar. She lives in Portland, Oregon, in the United States. Her use of language and words is central to her work: "Words may be the closest we get to immortality as humans. Death has no power over those words. Geography has no power over them. They transmit something beyond any one, or any community's, lifetime." She played violin for eight years in the rock-klezmer band Golem.

Biography
She got her B.A. in English and creative writing at Barnard College, received an M.F.A. in poetry from Warren Wilson College, an M.A. in Jewish gender and women's studies from the Jewish Theological Seminary, and studied for two years at the Pardes Institute of Jewish Studies in Jerusalem.

During the Fall 2016 session, she taught a course, "Arts and Jewish Experience: Exploring Diverse American Identities through Art", at Portland State University.

In 2014, Rabins performed "A Kaddish for Bernie Madoff". She has performed at: Webster Hall, New York City (October 27, 2008); "A Kaddish for Bernie Madoff", Portland State University (May 2014);
University of North Carolina at Asheville (March 6, 2018); and 
The Poetry Project, New York City (November 26, 2018). Rabins and her work has been featured in The New York Times, Literary Mama, the Jewish Women's Archive, Lilith, The Forward, Tablet, Oregon Public Broadcasting, and more.

Jo Rabins is married to bassist Aaron Hartman and has two children.

Discography 
Sugar Shack (2003)
 Girls in Trouble (2009)
 Half You Half Me (2011)
 Open the Ground (2015)

Filmography 
 A Kaddish for Bernie Madoff: The Film

Publications

Books 
 Divinity School
Fruit Geode

Writings 
 A Passover Story

Awards 
 2015 Honickman Book Prize Winner

References

External links 
 
Alicia Jo Rabins on Jewish Women's Archive

Living people
Barnard College alumni
Jewish Theological Seminary of America alumni
Writers from Portland, Oregon
Warren Wilson College alumni
Jewish American writers
Jewish poets
American women poets
Musicians from Portland, Oregon
Year of birth missing (living people)
21st-century American poets
21st-century American women writers
21st-century American musicians
21st-century American women musicians
American violinists
Women violinists
Klezmer musicians
American punk rock musicians
Women in punk